Epicopeia battaka is a moth in the family Epicopeiidae. It was described by Heinrich Wolfgang Ludwig Dohrn in 1895. It is found on Sumatra and Peninsular Malaysia.

Subspecies
Epicopeia battaka battaka (northern Sumatra)
Epicopeia battaka dempona Kishida & Endo, 1999 (southern Sumatra)
Epicopeia battaka malayana Kishida & Endo, 1999 (Peninsular Malaysia)

References

Moths described in 1895
Epicopeiidae